Protein histidine kinase may refer to:
 Histidine kinase, an enzyme
 Protein-histidine tele-kinase, an enzyme
 Protein-histidine pros-kinase, an enzyme